El Saff is a city in the Giza Governorate, Egypt. Its population was estimated at about 59,000 people in 2018.

Background
El Saff is a Markaz and city located about 30 km south of Helwan, which includes more than 30 villages, and it follows the Giza Governorate, although it is located on the eastern shore of the Nile River, opposite Al-Ayyat B center. The West is the Nile River, and from the east is the Eastern desert. The city is known for the clay brick factories that spread widely over the area and the villages of Askar, Al-Wadi, and Abu Abu Sa’id.

The most famous cities in El Saff Markaz:

 El Saff El Balad village
 Ghamza AL Kubra village
 Al Akhsas village
 El Shobak El sharqy village
 Kafr Tarchan village
 Askar village
 El Wadi village
 Al Aquas wel Fahmyen village
Nazlet El Eryan village
El Shorfa village
El Desmy village

Most of the villages and areas of the center are located to the east and west of the desert road to Upper Egypt, which connects the center to Upper Egypt, Cairo and Helwan. The army also made a road over the markaz about 15 km connecting the center to Cairo, the ring road and the highway over Cairo. According to tradition, the Prophet Moses was born in the village of Askar.

References 

Populated places in Giza Governorate